Eriosyce senilis, called old-man cactus along with a number of similar species, is a species of cactus in the genus Eriosyce, native to Chile. It has gained the Royal Horticultural Society's Award of Garden Merit.

References

Notocacteae
Endemic flora of Chile
Plants described in 1994